Anatoly Anatolyevich Lobotsky (born 14 January 1959, Tambov, Tambov Oblast, RSFSR, USSR) is  a Soviet and Russian theater and film actor. He is an  best known for role  in Vladimir Menshov's 2000 drama film  The Envy of Gods (as André). In 2013, he was awarded the title of People's Artist of the Russian Federation (2013).

Biography
Anatoly Lobotsky was born on 14 January 1959 in Tambov, into a family of employees. The father is a journalist, the mother is a librarian.

Selected filmography
 Trifles of Life (1992)  as Roman Bukreyev
 The Envy of Gods (2000) as André, French journalist
 Still Waters  (2000) as  Alexey Yozhikov
 The Admiral (2008) as Count Chelyshev
 The Priest (2009) as Colonel Freigausen
 The Junior Team (2013) as Stanislav Mikhailovich Kostrov
  (2014) as Vyacheslav Bykov
 Mata Hari (2017) as  Monsieur Malle
 AK-47 (2020) as colonel Glukhov

Awards
 Honored Artist of the Russian Federation (1998)
 IX St. Petersburg  All-Russian Film Festival — Best Actor (The Envy of Gods) 
 People's Artist of the Russian Federation (2013)
 Order of Friendship (2019)

References

External links 
 Official site
 

1959 births
Living people
People from Tambov
People's Artists of Russia
Honored Artists of the Russian Federation
Russian Academy of Theatre Arts alumni
Soviet male film actors
Soviet male stage actors
Russian male film actors
Russian male stage actors
Russian male television actors